The Mauser–Vergueiro was a bolt-action rifle, designed in 1904 by José Alberto Vergueiro, an infantry officer of the Portuguese Army, and manufactured by Deutsche Waffen und Munitionsfabriken (DWM). It was developed from the Mauser 98 rifle with the introduction of a new bolt system derived from the Gewehr 1888 and Mannlicher–Schönauer. Outside Portugal, the weapon was also known as the Portuguese Mauser. It used the 6.5×58mm Vergueiro, a cartridge developed specially for it.

The weapon replaced the Kropatschek m/1886 as the standard infantry rifle of the Portuguese Army in 1904, remaining in service until it was replaced by the Mauser 98k in 1939. In Portuguese service the weapon was officially designated Espingarda 6,5 mm m/1904 ("Rifle 6.5mm m/1904"). A lighter and shorter version of the weapon was classified as a carbine and designated Carabina 6,5 mm m/1904 ("Carbine 6.5mm m/1904"). A total of 100,000 rifles were produced for Portugal. An additional 5,000 Mauser–Vergueiro rifles, chambered in 7×57mm Mauser, were produced in 1906 for Brazil's Federal Police, using leftover components from the Portuguese order and issued in the cities of Rio de Janeiro and São Paulo. In 1915, 20,000 of Portugal's Mauser–Vergueiro rifles were sold to South Africa, which had insufficient Lee–Enfield SMLE rifles to supply all of its troops.

In Portuguese and South African service it was used in combat in the First World War and in several colonial campaigns. The German colonial troops in East Africa also used Mauser–Vergueiro rifles, captured from the allied forces in combat. The Portuguese Expeditionary Corps on the Western Front used British weapons and equipment for logistical reasons, and so did not use the Vergueiro. Although Portugal was neutral in World War II, in 1942 Portuguese forces briefly fought against the Japanese occupation of Portuguese Timor using Kropatschek rifles

In 1939, after the Portuguese Army had adopted the 7.92×57mm Mauser 98k as the m/937, many of the remaining Mauser–Vergueiro rifles were modified to chamber the new standard cartridge. The modified rifles were called Espingarda 8 mm m/1904-39. Markings on the modified rifles remained unchanged with the exception of the caliber designation "6,5" being stamped over on some rifles with two "X" marks. This was apparently done by individual Portuguese armorers rather than as standard practice. The 8mm variant can be distinguished visually from the 6.5mm variant with the 1939 modifications including a shorter barrel, distinctive front sight protector and ground down rear sight base.

The 7.92x57mm Mauser–Vergueiro rifle was kept in limited use in the Portuguese Army until the middle 1960s, mainly in some Overseas units.

These rifles are still used in Africa, for example in the Northern Mali conflict.

Notes

http://www.cptpp.com/fotos/2011/Mauser-Vergueiro-october-2011-TargetShooter-magazine-online.pdf

Gallery

Bolt-action rifles
Weapons of Portugal